Hendrick van Berckenrode (c.1565 – 1634), was a Dutch Golden Age mayor of Haarlem.

Biography
He was the son of Adriaen van Berckenrode, a Haarlem judge and mayor, and Christina van Blanckeroort. He never married and became a judge, magistrate and mayor of Haarlem like his father. He became a member of the Hoogheemraadschap van Rijnland and colonel of the St. George militia in Haarlem from 1606 to 1615, and colonel of the St. Adrian militia from 1618 to 1621. He was portrayed by Frans Hals in The Banquet of the Officers of the St George Militia Company in 1616.

He died in Haarlem as the last of the Berckenrodes of castle Berckenrode and was buried in the Grote Kerk.

References

Hendrick van Berckenrode in De Haarlemse Schuttersstukken, by Jhr. Mr. C.C. van Valkenburg, pp. 66, Haerlem : jaarboek 1958, ISSN 0927-0728, on the website of the North Holland Archives

1560s births
1634 deaths
Frans Hals
People from Haarlem
Mayors of Haarlem